Cristian Nagornîi is a Moldovan professional footballer who plays as a midfielder.

Football career
Nagornîi made his professional debut for Zimbru in the Divizia Națională on 1 October 2016 against Saxan, coming on as an 89th-minute substitute.

Notes

References

External links

1998 births
Living people
Moldovan footballers
Moldovan Super Liga players
FC Zimbru Chișinău players
Association football midfielders